The 2015 World Long Distance Mountain Running Championships (or 2015 World Long Distance MR Championships), was the 12th edition of the global Mountain running competition, World Long Distance Mountain Running Championships, organised by the World Mountain Running Association and was held in Zermatt, Switzerland on 4 July 2015.

Results

Men individual (42.2 km/+ 1900 m)

Women individual

References

External links
 World Mountain Running Association official web site

World Long Distance Mountain Running Championships
World Long Distance Mountain Running